Marina Melnikova and Laura Pous Tió were the defending champions, but chose not to participate.

Due to the violent situations in Turkey caused by the 2016 Turkish coup d'état attempt, the tournament was abandoned without finishing the final. Ekaterine Gorgodze, Sofia Shapatava, Akgul Amanmuradova and Natela Dzalamidze were the four players left in the final.

Seeds

Draw

References 
 Draw

Bursa Cup - Doubles
Bursa Cup